Ballan may refer to:

Places
Ballan, Victoria, a town in Australia
Shire of Ballan, a former local government area in Victoria, Australia
Ballan, India, a village in Punjab, India

Other uses
Ballan (surname)
Ballan (cycling team), a cycling team in 1998

See also
Ballan wrasse, a fish species